Peoria is a city in and seat of government of Peoria County, Illinois, United States. Located on the Illinois River, the city had a population of 113,150 as of the 2020 census. It is the principal city of the Peoria Metropolitan Area in Central Illinois, consisting of the counties of Fulton, Marshall, Peoria, Stark, Tazewell, and Woodford, which had a population of 402,391 in 2020.

Established in 1691 by the French explorer Henri de Tonti, Peoria is the oldest permanent European settlement in Illinois according to the Illinois State Archaeological Survey. Originally known as Fort Clark, it received its current name when the County of Peoria was organized in 1825. The city was named after the Peoria people, a member of the Illinois Confederation. On October 16, 1854, Abraham Lincoln made his Peoria speech against the Kansas-Nebraska Act. Prior to prohibition, Peoria was the center of the whiskey industry in the United States. More than 12 distilleries operated in Peoria by the end of the 19th century, more than any other city in the U.S. 

A major port on the Illinois River, Peoria is a trading and shipping center for a large agricultural area that produces corn, soybeans, and livestock. Although the economy is well diversified, the city's traditional manufacturing industries remain important and produce earthmoving equipment, metal products, lawn-care equipment, labels, steel towers, farm equipment, building materials, steel, wire, and chemicals. Until 2018, Peoria was the global and national headquarters for heavy equipment and engine manufacturer Caterpillar Inc., one of the 30 companies composing the Dow Jones Industrial Average, and listed on the Fortune 100; in the latter year, the company relocated its headquarters to Deerfield, Illinois.

The city is associated with the phrase "Will it play in Peoria?", which originated from the vaudeville era and was popularized by Groucho Marx. Museums in the city include the Pettengill-Morron House, the John C. Flanagan House, and the Peoria Riverfront Museum.

History

Peoria is the oldest European settlement in Illinois, as explorers first ventured up the Illinois River from the Mississippi. The lands that eventually would become Peoria were first settled by Europeans in 1680, when French explorers René-Robert Cavelier, Sieur de La Salle and Henri de Tonti constructed Fort Crevecoeur. This fort would later burn to the ground, and in 1813, Fort Clark, Illinois was built. When the County of Peoria was organized in 1825, Fort Clark was officially named Peoria.

Peoria was named after the Peoria tribe, a member of the Illinois Confederation. The original meaning of the word is uncertain. A 21st-century proposal suggests a derivation from a Proto-Algonquian word meaning "to dream with the help of a manitou."

Peoria was incorporated as a village on March 11, 1835. The city did not have a mayor, though they had a village president, Rudolphus Rouse, who served from 1835 to 1836. The first Chief of Police, John B Lishk, was appointed in 1837. The city was incorporated on April 21, 1845. This was the end of a village president and the start of the mayoral system, with the first mayor being William Hale.

Peoria, Arizona, a suburb of Phoenix, was named after Peoria, Illinois because the two men who founded it in 1890 − Joseph B. Greenhut and Deloss S. Brown − wished to name it after their hometown.

For much of the 20th century, a red-light district of brothels and bars known as the Merry-Go-Round was part of Peoria.

Richard Pryor got his start as a performer on North Washington Street in the early 1960s.

In 2021, Rita Ali became Peoria's first female and African American mayor.

Notable events
September 19 to October 21, 1813 – Peoria War
1844 – Abraham Lincoln came to Peoria to get involved in the Aquilla Wren divorce case and took it to the Supreme Court of Illinois
April 15, 1926 – Charles Lindbergh's first air mail route, Contract Air Mail route #2, began running mail from Chicago to Peoria to Springfield to St. Louis and back.  There is nothing to substantiate the local legend that Lindbergh offered Peoria the chance to sponsor his trans-Atlantic flight and call his plane the "Spirit of Peoria," but he does state that he first pondered the journey after taking off from the Peoria air mail field.
1942 – Penicillium chrysogenum, the fungus originally used to industrially produce penicillin, was first isolated from a mouldy cantaloupe found in a grocery store in Peoria.
Theodore Roosevelt called Grandview Drive, a street on the bluffs overlooking the Illinois River "the world's most beautiful drive." The Peoria radio station and CBS television affiliate WMBD attached the description to its call sign.

Geography

Climate
Peoria has a humid continental climate (Köppen Dfa), with cold, snowy winters, and hot, humid summers. Snowfall is common in the winter, averaging , but this figure varies considerably from year to year. Precipitation, averaging , peaks in the spring and summer, and is the lowest in winter.

Demographics

2020 census

Note: the US Census treats Hispanic/Latino as an ethnic category. This table excludes Latinos from the racial categories and assigns them to a separate category. Hispanics/Latinos can be of any race.

2010 Census
As of the census of 2010, there were 115,021 people and 47,202 households residing in the city. There were 52,621 housing units. The racial makeup of the city was 62.4% White, 26.9% Black or African American, 0.3% Native American, 4.6% Asian, and 3.6% of mixed races. Hispanic or Latino of any race were 4.9% of the population. The city has a sizable, established Lebanese population with a long history in local business and government.

There were 45,199 households, out of which 29.0% had children under the age of 18 living with them, 41.6% were married couples living together, 15.5% had a female householder with no husband present, and 39.5% were non-families. Individuals made up 33.2% of all households, and 11.7% had someone living alone who was 65 years of age or older. The average household size was 2.39 and the average family size was 3.04.

The age distribution of city population was the following: 25.7% under the age of 18, 12.0% from 18 to 24, 27.2% from 25 to 44, 20.8% from 45 to 64, and 14.2% who were 65 years of age or older. The median age was 34 years. For every 100 females, there were 89.9 males. For every 100 females age 18 and over, there were 85.0 males.

The median income for a household in the city was $36,397. The per capita income for the city was $20,512. Some 18.8% of the population was below the poverty line.

Special censuses were conducted in 2004 and 2007 that noted a total increase of 8,455 in the city's population since the 2000 census.

Economy

Industry

Peoria's first major industry was started in 1830 by John Hamlin and John Sharp, who constructed the flour mill on Kickapoo Creek.  In 1837, another industry was begun with E.F. Nowland's pork planting industry. Many other industries started slowly in Peoria including carriage factories, pottery makers, wholesale warehousing, casting foundries, glucose factories, ice harvesting, and furniture makers.

Peoria became the first world leader for distilleries thanks to Andrew Eitle (1837) and Almiron S. Cole (1844). 

  In 1889, Keystone Steel & Wire developed the first wire fence and has since been the nation's leading manufacturer.

At this time, agricultural implement production declined, which led the earth moving and tractor equipment companies to skyrocket and make Peoria in this field the world leader. In 1925, Caterpillar Tractor Co. was formed from California-based companies, Benjamin Holt Co. and the C.L. Best Tractor Co. Robert G. LeTourneau's earth moving company began its production of new scrapers and dozers in 1935 which evolved into Komatsu-Dresser, Haulpak Division. 

The world headquarters for Caterpillar Inc. was based in Peoria for over 110 years until announcing their move to Deerfield, Illinois in late-2017. Medicine has become a major part of Peoria's economy. In addition to three major hospitals, the USDA's National Center for Agricultural Utilization Research, formerly called the USDA Northern Regional Research Lab, is located in Peoria. This is one of the labs where mass production of penicillin was developed.

More recently Peoria has become a regional medical hub for central Illinois with recent hospital expansions.

Retail
The city's largest mall is Northwoods Mall.  Other retail centers include The Shoppes at Grand Prairie, Sheridan Village, Metro Centre, Willow Knolls Court, and Westlake Shopping Center.

Businesses
Bergner's (until August 2018 when it went bankrupt and closed nationwide): Department store; started in 1889 in downtown Peoria and eventually bought out Carson Pirie Scott & Co. (now part of Bon-Ton)
Caterpillar (until 2017 when its headquarters (approximately 300 positions) moved to Deerfield, Illinois): Heavy equipment and engine manufacturer. Caterpillar still maintains a large working force in the area in management, marketing, IT, engineering and labor union manufacturing, as well as other positions.
CEFCU: Credit union; started by Caterpillar employees; now serves residents of 14 counties in Central Illinois and 3 in California
Komatsu America Corporation: World's second-largest mining equipment manufacturer has a large manufacturing facility in Peoria
Maui Jim (World Headquarters): Sunglasses manufacturer
National Center for Agricultural Utilization Research: Largest USDA research facility; one of the facilities where mass production of penicillin was improved
OSF Healthcare, which operates OSF Saint Francis Medical Center
RLI Corp. (World Headquarters): Specialty insurance company
UnityPoint Health: Owns three hospitals in the area, two in Peoria

Top employers
According to Peoria's 2018 Comprehensive Annual Financial Report, the top employers in the city are:

Arts and culture

Museums in Peoria include the Pettengill-Morron House, the John C Flanagan House of the Peoria Historical Society, and the Wheels o' Time Museum. The Museum Block, opened on October 12, 2012, houses the Peoria Riverfront Museum, a planetarium, and the Caterpillar World Visitors Center.

The Peoria Art Guild hosts the Annual Art Fair, which is continually rated as one of the 100 top art fairs in the nation.

Three cultural institutions are located in Glen Oak Park. The Peoria Zoo, formerly Glen Oak Zoo, was expanded and refurbished in recent years. Finished in 2009, the new zoo improvements more than triple the size of the zoo and feature a major African safari exhibit. 

The Steamboat Classic, held every summer, is the world's largest four-mile (6 km) running race and draws international runners.

The Peoria Santa Claus Parade, which started in 1888, is the oldest running holiday parade in the United States.

Library
Library services in Peoria originated in 1855 with two rival libraries, the Peoria Mercantile Library and the Peoria Library, which consolidated in 1856 as the Peoria City Library, and contained over 1,500 volumes. The Peoria Public Library has five locations, including the Lincoln Branch, a Carnegie library opened in 1911.

Performing arts
The Peoria Symphony Orchestra is the 14th oldest in the nation. Peoria is also home to the Peoria Municipal Band, the Peoria Area Civic Chorale, the Youth Music Illinois (formerly known as Central Illinois Youth Symphony), Central Illinois Ballet, and the Peoria Ballet. Several community and professional theaters have their home in and around Peoria, including the Peoria Players, which is the fourth-oldest community theater in the nation and the oldest in Illinois. Corn Stock Theatre is another community theater company in Peoria, and is the only outdoor theater company in Central Illinois.

 The fair features livestock competitions, rides, concessions, motor contests and concerts.

Civic Center

The Peoria Civic Center includes an arena, convention center, and theater, and was completed in the early 1980s, was designed by the famed late architect Philip Johnson.  It completed a $55 million renovation and expansion by 2007.

The Hotel Pere Marquette finished renovations in 2013  with a skyway linking to the Peoria Civic Center.  A new 10-story Courtyard has been built adjacent to this hotel, completing a hotel campus for larger conventions.

The Civic Center hosts the Bradley University Men's Basketball team, the IHSA Boys State Basketball Championships and State Chess Championship. Which claims to be the largest chess team tournament in the United States: Beginning in 2018, the teams were narrowed to 128 by the use of sectional elimination competitions, and  the tournament has about 1500 players, including up to 8 players and 4 alternates per team.

Renaissance Park
Renaissance Park was originally designated as a research park, originally established in May 2003 as the Peoria Medical and Technology District. It consisted of nine residential neighborhoods, Bradley University, the medical district, and the National Center for Agricultural Utilization Research. The Peoria NEXT Innovation Center opened in August 2007 and provides both dry and wet labs, as well as conference and office space for emerging start-up companies. Over $2 billion in research is conducted in Peoria annually. While the Renaissance Park research park project never came to full fruition, many of the original ideas from the original Renaissance Park concept still continue on a smaller level via The Renaissance Park Community Association.

The Museum Block
The Museum Block is a $100+ million project that contains the Peoria Riverfront Museum and The Caterpillar Experience, a museum and visitor's center showcasing Caterpillar past, present, and future.  It is located in downtown Peoria along the Illinois River at the site formerly known as the Sears Block. The Block opened in October 2012.

Registered historic places

 Central National Bank Building
 Cumberland Presbyterian Church
 Grand Army of the Republic Memorial Hall
 Grandview Drive
 International Harvester Building
 John C. Proctor Recreation Center
 Judge Flanagan Residence
 Judge Jacob Gale House
 Madison Theatre
 North Side Historic District
 Peace and Harvest
 Peoria City Hall
 Peoria Cordage Company
 Peoria Mineral Springs
 Peoria Waterworks
 Pere Marquette Hotel
 Pettingill-Morron House
 Rock Island Depot and Freight House
 Springdale Cemetery
 West Bluff Historic District
  A. Lucas & Sons

Points of interest

The city of Peoria is home to a United States courthouse and the Peoria Civic Center (which includes Carver Arena).
Civil War Monument at County Courthouse Plaza
Grandview Drive along the Illinois River bluff in Peoria and Peoria Heights
Glen Oak Park, including Glen Oak Zoo and George L. Luthy Memorial Botanical Garden
Cathedral of Saint Mary of the Immaculate Conception (Peoria, Illinois) (also known as St. Mary's Cathedral)
Scottish Rite Cathedral
Peoria Riverfront Museum and Caterpillar Visitor Center along the downtown waterfront. The third largest scale model of the solar system is centered on the museum.
Dozer Park - home of the Peoria Chiefs professional baseball team located in the downtown sector

Sports

Parks and recreation
Grandview Drive, which Theodore Roosevelt purportedly called the "world's most beautiful drive" during a 1910 visit, runs through both Peoria and Peoria Heights. In addition to Grandview Drive, the Peoria Park District contains  of parks and trails. The Illinois River Bluff Trail connects four Peoria Park District parks: Camp Wokanda, Robinson Park, Green Valley Camp, and Detweiller Park; the Rock Island Greenway (13 miles) connects the State of Illinois Rock Island trail traveling north to Toulon, IL and also connects southeast to East Peoria, IL and to the Morton Community Bikeway. Other parks include the Forest Park Nature Center, which features seven miles of hiking trails through prairie openings and forested woodlands, Glen Oak Park, and Bradley Park, which features disc golf as well as a dog park. Peoria has five public golf courses as well as several private and semi-private golf courses. The Peoria Park District, the first and still largest park district in Illinois, was the 2001 Winner of the National Gold Medal Award for Excellence in Parks and Recreation for Class II Parks.

Government

Peoria is a home rule municipality with a mayor and ten city council members. It has a council-manager form of government.  The city is divided into five districts. Five council members are elected at-large via cumulative voting.

Township of the City of Peoria

The Township of the City of Peoria (also City of Peoria Township) is a separate government from the City of Peoria, and performs the functions of civil township government in most of the city. The township was created by the Peoria County Board to match the boundaries of the City of Peoria, which until then had overlapped portions of Peoria Township (now West Peoria Township) and Richwoods Township. In the years before the freeze, the Township of the City of Peoria had grown to take up most of the former area of Richwoods and what is now West Peoria Township.

The unincorprated towns of Averyville and El Vista that were assimilated by the City of Peoria are also located in this township.

Education

Peoria is served by four public K-12 school districts:
 Peoria Public Schools District 150 is the largest and serves the majority of the city. District 150 schools include dozens of primary and middle schools, as well as three public high schools: Richwoods High School, which hosts the competitive International Baccalaureate Program of study; Manual High School; and Peoria High School (Central), the oldest high school in Illinois. Until the end of the 2009–2010 school year, a fourth high school, Woodruff High School, closed. According to SchoolDigger, District 150 has the highest-ranking middle school (Washington Gifted Middle School).
 Peoria District 150 is also served by Quest Charter Academy, a STEM focused school serving grades 5-12. Quest is the only charter school in the area and began in 2010.
 Dunlap Community Unit School District 323 serves the far north and northwest parts of Peoria that were mostly outside the city before the 1990s. Dunlap schools has Dunlap High School, 2 Middle Schools and 5 Elementary schools.
 Limestone Community High School District 310 serves a small portion of the western edge of the City of Peoria (western edges of Wardcliffe and Lexington Hills areas), but mainly serves the suburbs of Bartonville, Bellevue and surrounding towns.
 Peoria Heights Community Unit School District 325 serves the suburb of Peoria Heights; however, parts of the City of Peoria immediately outside the Heights are in this school district.

The Roman Catholic Diocese of Peoria runs six schools in the city: five grade schools and Peoria Notre Dame High School. Non-denominational Peoria Christian School operates a grade school, middle school, and high school.

In addition, Concordia Lutheran School, Peoria Academy, Christ Lutheran School, and several smaller private schools exist.

Bradley University, Methodist College, OSF St. Francis College of Nursing, the University of Illinois College of Medicine at Peoria, and the Downtown and North campuses of Illinois Central College are based in the city. The former Peoria campus of Roosevelt University is now closed. Additionally, Eureka College and the main campus of Illinois Central College are located nearby in Eureka and East Peoria, respectively.

Media

Peoria is the 153rd largest radio market in the United States and Peoria-Bloomington is the 117th largest television market in the United States.

The area has 14 commercial radio stations with six owners among them; four non-commercial full-power radio stations, each separately owned; five commercial television stations with two operating owners among them; one non-commercial television station; and one daily newspaper (Peoria Journal Star).

NOAA Weather Radio

NOAA Weather Radio station WXJ71 transmits from East Peoria and is licensed to NOAA's National Weather Service Central Illinois Weather Forecast Office at Lincoln, broadcasting on a frequency of 162.475 mHz (channel 4 on most newer weather radios, and most SAME weather radios). The station activates the SAME tone alarm feature and a 1050 Hz tone activating older radios (except for AMBER Alerts, using the SAME feature only) for hazardous weather and non-weather warnings and emergencies, along with selected weather watches, for the Illinois counties of Fulton, Knox, Marshall, Mason, McLean, Peoria, Stark, Tazewell, and Woodford. Weather permitting, a tone alarm test of both the SAME and 1050 Hz tone features are conducted every Wednesday between 11 AM and noon.

Infrastructure

Health and medicine
The health-care industry accounts for at least 25% of Peoria's economy. The city has three major hospitals: OSF Saint Francis Medical Center, UnityPoint Health – Methodist, and UnityPoint Health – Proctor. In addition, the Children's Hospital of Illinois, the University of Illinois College of Medicine at Peoria, and the Midwest Affiliate of St. Jude Children's Research Hospital are located in the city. The hospitals are all located in a medical district around the junction of Interstate 74 and Knoxville Avenue, adjacent to downtown in the southeast of the city, except for UnityPoint Health – Proctor in the geographic center of the city.  The surrounding towns are also supported by UnityPoint Health – Proctor, Pekin Hospital, Advocate Eureka Hospital, and the Hopedale Medical Complex. The Institute of Physical Medicine and Rehabilitation was created from the "Peoria Plan for Human Rehabilitation," a model for medical and occupational rehabilitation launched in 1943 to integrate returning World War II veterans back into the workplace.

Transportation

Interstate and U.S. routes
The Peoria area is served by three Interstate highways: Interstate 74, which runs from northwest to southeast through the downtown area, Interstate 474, a southern bypass of I-74 through portions of Peoria and the suburbs of Bartonville and Creve Coeur, and Interstate 155, which runs south from I-74 in Morton to Interstate 55 in Lincoln which connects to Springfield and St. Louis. I-74 crosses over the Illinois River via the Murray Baker Bridge, while I-474 crosses via the Shade-Lohmann Bridge. The nearest metropolitan centers accessible on I-74 are the Quad Cities to the west, and Bloomington-Normal to the east.

From 2004 to 2006, Interstate 74 between Interstate 474 on the west and Illinois Route 8 on the east was reconstructed as part of the Upgrade 74 project.

In addition, U.S. Route 150 serves as the main arterial for the northern portion of the Peoria area, becoming War Memorial Drive before heading west towards Kickapoo. It enters from the McClugage Bridge; east of the bridge, then runs southeast to Morton. U.S. Route 24 runs concurrently with Interstate 474 in the southwest portion of the city.

State routes
The following state routes run through Peoria:

 Illinois Route 6 runs along the northwestern portion of the city as an extension of I-474. It is a four-lane freeway that runs from the I-74/474 intersection northeast to Illinois Route 29 south of Chillicothe. It is marked as a north–south road.
 Illinois Route 8 roughly parallels I-74 to the south. It enters Peoria from Elmwood and runs southeast through the city, passing just southwest of the downtown area. Illinois 8 crosses into East Peoria via the Cedar Street Bridge with 116. Illinois 8 is marked as an east–west road.
 Illinois Route 29 runs through Peoria along the Illinois River from Chillicothe through downtown Peoria. It then joins Interstate 74 across the Murray Baker Bridge. Illinois 29 is marked as a north–south road, and is called Galena Road north of U.S. 150.
 Illinois Route 40 (formerly 88) enters Peoria from the north as Knoxville Avenue. It runs south through the center of the city and exits southeast over the Bob Michel Bridge. Illinois 40 is marked as a north–south road.
 Illinois Route 91 briefly enters Peoria at the intersection with U.S. 150 in the far northwestern portion of the city. Traffic on Illinois 91 mainly accesses The Shoppes at Grand Prairie, or continues to Dunlap.
 Illinois Route 116 enters from the west at Bellevue. It runs directly east and crosses into East Peoria over the Cedar Street Bridge.

The planned Illinois Route 336 project will also connect Illinois 336 with I-474 between Illinois 8 and Illinois 116. Construction on the segment nearest Peoria has not started, nor has funding been allocated.

Rail transportation
Metro Peoria is served by ten common carrier railroads. Four are Class I railroads: BNSF, Canadian National, Norfolk Southern and Union Pacific. The latter has a north–south oriented line which skirts the west edge of the city but a line branches off of it to enter Peoria. One Class II/Regional, Iowa Interstate, serves the city, coming out of Bureau Junction, Illinois. Five Class III/Shortline railroads: Central Illinois Railroad, which operates a portion of the city-owned Peoria, Peoria Heights and Western Railroad; three Genesee & Wyoming-owned operations: Toledo, Peoria & Western Railway, which runs next to US 24 east to Logansport, Indiana (formally owned by Rail America), Illinois & Midland Railroad (the former Chicago & Illinois Midland, comes up from Springfield and Havana) and Tazewell & Peoria Railroad (leases the Peoria & Pekin Union Railway from its owners Canadian National, Norfolk Southern and Union Pacific); Pioneer Railcorp's Keokuk Junction Railway (which now owns the Toledo, Peoria and Western's West End from Lomax and La Harpe in Western Illinois, plus the branch from Keokuk).

Peoria was a minor passenger rail hub until the 1950s. Several Midwestern railroads served Peoria Union Station until 1955. The Rock Island Railroad operated trains into its Rock Island Depot until 1978, when they discontinued the Peoria Rocket. East Peoria was served by Amtrak's Prairie Marksman (Chicago–East Peoria) until 1981. Peoria is currently the largest city in Illinois without passenger rail service; the closest passenger stations are Galesburg (served by Amtrak's Chicago–Los Angeles Southwest Chief) and Bloomington (served by Amtrak's Chicago-St. Louis Lincoln Service).

A study of East Peoria–Bloomington passenger rail service was published in 2011. Plans for the proposed service, which would have connected with Amtrak’s Lincoln Service at Bloomington, were abandoned due to financial considerations. 

A study of Peoria–Chicago passenger rail service was published in July 2022. The study, conducted by IDOT at the request of a Passenger Rail Committee established in August 2021, estimated that startup costs for the proposed service would be $2.54 billion. The service would be operated by Amtrak and would have intermediate stops at LaSalle-Peru, Utica, Ottawa, Morris, and Joliet. The trip between Peoria and Chicago would take about  hours. Committee members, who met with federal transportation officials and Amtrak's CEO, were hopeful about securing funding.

Public transportation
Public bus service is provided by the Greater Peoria Mass Transit District, which operates 17 bus routes under the name CityLink, that serve the city, Illinois Central College and much of East Peoria, Illinois, Peoria Heights, West Peoria, and points between Peoria and Pekin.

Aviation
The General Wayne Downing Peoria International Airport is located west of Peoria. The airport is served by 3 passenger airlines (United, American,  and Allegiant Air) and numerous cargo carriers. Nonstop destinations include Chicago, Dallas/Ft. Worth, Las Vegas, Phoenix, Punta Gorda, and Charlotte.  Seasonal destinations include Denver, Nashville, and Destin Fort Walton. Cargo carriers serving Peoria include UPS and Airborne Express (now DHL).

Mount Hawley Auxiliary Airport, on the north end of the city, is a general aviation airport.

Notable people

Gerald Thomas Bergan, clergyman of the Roman Catholic Church
Lydia Moss Bradley, founded Bradley University.
Howard Brown, founder of the National Gay Task Force 
Dan Fogelberg
Betty Friedan, feminist writer and activist
Joe Girardi, baseball player and manager
John Grier Hibben
Bruce Johnston, member of The Beach Boys
Jim Jordan (Fibber McGee), Fibber McGee and Molly radio show
Marian Jordan (Molly), Fibber McGee and Molly radio show
Mudvayne, popular heavy metal band formed in 1996
Tim Kelley Multi Grammy Award Winning Record Producer, Key To The City of Peoria recipient
Thomas D. Duane, Ophthalmologist who first described valsalva retinopathy in 1972.
Tami Lane
Ralph Lawler
Shaun Livingston
Bobby McGrath, pool player
Sherrick McManis
Bob Michel
Richard Pryor, stand-up comedian and actor
Brian Randle (born 1985), basketball player for Maccabi Tel Aviv of the Israeli Basketball Super League
Gary Richrath, guitarist
Bob Robinson
Jeff Salzenstein (born 1973), tennis player
Fulton J. Sheen
David Sills, former mayor of Irvine, California and son-in-law of President Ronald Reagan
Dan Simmons
Edward W. Snedeker
David Ogden Stiers, actor
Dr. Jokichi Takamine, chemist, lived in Peoria in the 1890s.
Jim Thome, baseball player
Greg X. Volz, singer
Richard A. Whiting, composer
Mike Zimmer, American football coach
A. J. Guyton, Professional basketball player, graduated from Peoria High School

Peoria in popular culture
The theme of Peoria as the archetypal example of middle American culture runs throughout American culture, appearing in movies and books, on television and radio, and in countless advertisements as either a filler place name or the representative of mainstream taste, hence the phrase "Will it play in Peoria?"

Music
 On the Songs: Ohia album called The Magnolia Electric Co (2003) there is a song by Jason Molina called "Peoria Lunch Box Blues".
 In Sufjan Stevens' album Illinois, Peoria is the subject of the song titled "Prairie Fire That Wanders About." Stevens makes reference to multiple figures in Peoria's history, including Lydia Moss Bradley, and also speaks of Peoria's Santa Claus parade, the longest running in the nation.
"Peoria" by King Crimson was recorded at The Barn in Peoria on March 10, 1972, included in the live album Earthbound.

Literature 
 Published posthumously in 2011, David Foster Wallace's unfinished novel The Pale King features vignettes based in Peoria.

News commentary
In 1977, the news magazine Time used Peoria as a form of "et cetera" in an article on the proliferation of new vineyards in America, calling them "the new Chateaux Peorias...."
A 2009 issue of National Geographic states in its "The Big Idea" section that electron-dispensing filling stations, a now-possible idea difficult to implement on a large scale, will soon "play even in Peoria".
In 2022, during a WWE house show event in Peoria Scarlett Bordeaux was assaulted by a fan an attendee resulting in international coverage.

Sister cities
Peoria's sister cities include: 
  Aitou, Lebanon
  Benxi, China
  Clonmel, Ireland
  Friedrichshafen, Germany

See also

General American English
Will it play in Peoria?
List of places named Peoria

References

External links

 
 General information
 
 
 Peoria Neighborhoods Map at Peoria.com

 
1691 establishments in New France
Cities in Peoria County, Illinois
County seats in Illinois
French colonial settlements of Upper Louisiana
Peoria metropolitan area, Illinois
Populated places established in 1691
Ronald Reagan Trail